Mount Sirung is an active volcano complex volcano located on Pantar Island in the Alor archipelago of the eastern Indonesian province of  Nusa Tenggara Timor. The crater rim can be reached by an easy hike from the village of Kakamauta. Inside the crater is a large sulphurous crater lake and several active steam vents. The last major eruption occurred 1970, and regular gas and clastic eruptions have occurred since 2004.  A small eruption beginning May 12, 2012 triggered an evacuation of an area within a 1.5 km radius of the caldera.

See also 

 List of volcanoes in Indonesia

References

External links
 Volcano Live
 Geology of Mt. Sirung (in Indonesian)
 Status Gunung Sirung Turun Jadi Waspada, Suara Mereka, 27 Mei 2012. (In Indonesian)

Mountains of Indonesia
Volcanoes of the Lesser Sunda Islands
Complex volcanoes
Volcanic crater lakes
Active volcanoes of Indonesia